William Gordon Wheeler (5 May 1910–21 February 1998) was an English prelate and the bishop emeritus of the Roman Catholic Diocese of Leeds. Wheeler had served as the seventh Roman Catholic Bishop of Leeds, being succeeded by David Konstant. Before that, he served as coadjutor bishop of the Diocese of Middlesbrough and as Titular Bishop of Theudalis.

Early life
Wheeler was born on 5 May 1910 in Saddleworth in the West Riding of Yorkshire, England, to Frederick (1880–1971) and Marjorie Wheeler (1881–1938). From 1924 to 1929, he was educated at Manchester Grammar School, then an all-boys free grammar school in Manchester. He studied history at University College, Oxford, graduating with a Bachelor of Arts (BA) degree in 1932. He was strongly influenced by the Anglo-Catholic tradition of the church in Worsley which he attended during his time at the grammar school.

Career

Church of England
From 1932 to 1933, Wheeler trained for holy orders in the Church of England at St Stephen's House, Oxford. He was ordained as a deacon in December 1933 by George Bell, Bishop of Chichester, and as an Anglican priest in December 1934 by Edmund Pearce, Bishop of Bristol. He began his ministry as a curate at St Bartholomew's Church, Brighton in 1933, and then at  St Mary and All Saints, Chesterfield in 1934. He was an assistant chaplain at Lancing College, then an all-boys public boarding school in 1935.

During this period, Wheeler became more and more convinced by the writings of Cardinal John Henry Newman, once also a priest of the Church of England and a leader of the Oxford Movement before being received into the Roman Catholic Church. On 18 September 1936, he finally followed the same path as Newman and was received into the Catholic Church during a service at Downside Abbey. He then enrolled at Beda College in Rome to study for the Catholic priesthood.

Catholic Church
On 31 March 1940, Wheeler was ordained as a Roman Catholic priest by Cardinal Hinsley, Archbishop of Westminster, during a service at Westminster Cathedral. He was firstly an assistant priest at St Edmund's Parish in Lower Edmonton from 1940 to 1944, then chaplain at Westminster Cathedral. He often made a point of noting to his clergy that he understood their difficulties from his having heard confessions every day of the 11 years he served at the cathedral. He became chaplain to Catholics at the University of London in 1950. He was appointed a privy chamberlain by Pope Pius XII in 1952, an honorary appointment. He returned to Westminster Cathedral in 1954, having been appointed administrator by Cardinal Bernard Griffin. He was promoted to domestic prelate by Pope Pius XII in 1955.

Wheeler was named by the Holy See to the episcopate as the coadjutor bishop of the Roman Catholic Diocese of Middlesbrough in 1964, immediately after which he participated in the last two sessions of the Second Vatican Council. Wheeler was named Roman Catholic Bishop of Leeds in 1966 and was an enthusiastic supporter of the spirit of the council. One example is that, immediately after his return from Rome, he founded a new ecumenical centre at Wood Hall in Wetherby, Yorkshire. Later, despite his feelings about the historic structure of the diocese, he followed part of its instruction by supervising the division of his diocese in 1980, in keeping with the conciliar mandate that dioceses be of such a size as to be truly manageable under the supervision of one bishop.

Wheeler remained a staunch conservative in matters of liturgical practice. He was the last bishop in England to use the cappa magna and had a strong attachment to the Tridentine Mass. He submitted his resignation as bishop of the diocese at the mandatory age of 75 in 1985. He then entered an active retirement at the College of the Blessed Virgin Mary in Headingley under the care of the Little Sisters of the Poor.

Death and legacy
Wheeler died on 21 February 1998, aged 87, after a brief illness. At his request, he was buried near his predecessor and the bishop who had ordained him in the Catholic Church, Bishop Henry John Poskitt, also a convert from the Church of England, in the Church of St Edward the Confessor in Clifford, West Yorkshire.

A noted author, Wheeler's memoir, In Truth and Love, was published in 1990.

In March 2013, Catholic primary and secondary schools in north west Leeds and Bradford joined together to gain academy status from the government, as a Catholic multi-academy trust. The trust, the second in the Diocese of Leeds, took the name "The Bishop Wheeler Catholic Academy Trust". At present, 6 schools form the parts of the trust, however 10 other Catholic schools could join in the future.

References

External links
 
 
 Profile on the Diocese of Leeds website

1910 births
1998 deaths
People from Saddleworth
People educated at Manchester Grammar School
Alumni of University College, Oxford
20th-century English Anglican priests
Anglican priest converts to Roman Catholicism
English College, Rome alumni
20th-century Roman Catholic bishops in England
Participants in the Second Vatican Council
English Roman Catholic writers
Burials in West Yorkshire
Alumni of St Stephen's House, Oxford
English Anglo-Catholics
Anglo-Catholic clergy
Roman Catholic bishops of Leeds